Janusz Zaorski (born 19 September 1947) is a Polish film director, scenarist and actor, representative of the cinema of moral anxiety, trend in Polish cinema. Zaorski has directed mainly psychological dramas, comedies and TV series.

Zaorski graduated National Film School in Łódź in 1969. He made his own individual film director debut in 1970. In 1987 Zaorski was selected as a chairman of the Polish Federation of Film Societies (Polska Federacja Dyskusyjnych Klubów Filmowych). He was also an art director of the Film Group "Dom" (since 1988), member of the Cinematography Committee (1987–1989), president of the Radio & Television Committee (1991–1992), president of The National Council of Radio Broadcasting and Television (Krajowa Rada Radiofonii i Telewizji; 1994–1995), member of the European Film Academy.

Selected filmography

Director
 Maestro (1967)
 Spowiedź (1968)
 Na dobranoc (1970)
 Uciec jak najbliżej (1971)
 Awans (1974)
 Zezem (1976) – TV series
 Zdjęcia próbne (1976)
 Pokój z widokiem na morze (1977)
 Dziecinne pytania (1981)
 Matka Królów (1982)
 Baryton (1984)
 Jezioro Bodeńskie (1985)
 Zabawa w chowanego (1985)
 Piłkarski poker (1988)
 Panny i wdowy (1991)
 Szczęśliwego Nowego Jorku (1997)
 Haker (2002)
 Cudownie ocalony (2004)
 Królewska ruletka (2004)
 Lekarz drzew (2005)

Actor
 Palec boży (1972)
 Zdjęcia próbne (1976)
 Mniejsze niebo (1980)
 Piłkarski poker (1988)

Writer
 Na dobranoc (1970)
 Pokój z widokiem na morze (1977)
 Zezem (1976) – TV series
 Jezioro Bodeńskie (1985)
 Szczęśliwego Nowego Jorku (1997)
 Haker (2002)
 Lekarz drzew (2005)

Awards

References
 Inline

 General

External links
 
 
 Janusz Zaorski at filmpolski.pl 

1947 births
Living people
Polish male film actors
Polish film directors
Polish screenwriters
Łódź Film School alumni